Kumundhoo (Dhivehi: ކުމުންދޫ) is one of the inhabited islands of Haa Dhaalu Atoll administrative division and geographically part of Thiladhummathi Atoll in the north of the Maldives.

History
An archaeological site from the pre-Islamic Buddhist era is found on the island. It is in the form of a stone circle known locally as Us-Kunna, possibly the remains of an ancient buddhist stupa.

Demonstrations in Kumundhoo in 2006 was among a long line of demonstrations against the government injustice and negligence of the outer islands by the government.

Geography

Demography

References

External links
www.kumundhoo.com

Islands of the Maldives